Eigil Reimers  (10 August 1904 – 11 November 1976) was a Danish actor.

Filmography 
Det sovende hus - 1926
Med fuld musik - 1933
5 raske piger - 1933
Prisoner Number One- 1935
Kidnapped - 1935
Min kone er husar - 1935
Week-End - 1935
Millionærdrengen - 1936
Snushanerne - 1936
En fuldendt gentleman - 1937
Champagnegaloppen - 1938
De tre, måske fire - 1939
I dag begynder livet - 1939
I de gode gamle dage - 1940
Sørensen og Rasmussen - 1940
Far skal giftes - 1941
Gå med mig hjem - 1941
Tror du jeg er født i går? - 1941
Afsporet - 1942
Alt for karrieren - 1943
Hans onsdagsveninde - 1943
Så mødes vi hos Tove - 1946
Sikken en nat - 1947
For frihed og ret - 1949
Café Paradis - 1950
Een blandt mange - 1961
Slottet - 1964
Tænk på et tal - 1969

External links

Biography at the Danish Film Institute (Danish)

Danish male film actors
Danish male actors
1904 births
1976 deaths
20th-century Danish male actors
People from Aarhus